The 1898 Wimbledon Championships was a tennis tournament that took place on the outdoor grass courts at the All England Lawn Tennis Club in Wimbledon, London, United Kingdom. The tournament ran from 20 June until 28 June. It was the 22nd staging of the Wimbledon Championships, and the first Grand Slam tennis event of 1898.

Champions

Men's singles

 Reginald Doherty defeated  Laurence Doherty, 6–3, 6–3, 2–6, 5–7, 6–1

Women's singles

 Charlotte Cooper defeated  Louisa Martin, 6–4, 6–4

Men's doubles

 Laurence Doherty /  Reginald Doherty defeated  Clarence Hobart /  Harold Nisbet, 6–4, 6–4, 6–2

References

External links
 Official Wimbledon Championships website

 
Wimbledon Championships
Wimbledon Championships
Wimbledon Championships
Wimbledon Championships